Karen Sinclair (born 20 November 1952) is a Welsh Labour politician, who represented the constituency of Clwyd South from when the National Assembly for Wales was established in 1999, until she stood down, in 2011. Born and brought up in Wrexham, north Wales, Sinclair has lived in Llangollen for over twenty years.

Education and professional career
Sinclair was educated at Grove Park Girls School, Wrexham.  After working in the Youth service for fourteen years, she became a Care Manager with Wrexham Social Services for clients with learning disabilities. She is also a trained CAB adviser. Sinclair has been a school governor at Ysgol Dinas Brân and chair of the Youth Club Committee.

Political career
Sinclair was a member of the former Glyndwr District council for seven years, preceding the local Government reorganisation and served on Denbighshire County Council. She chairs the URBAN II West Wrexham regeneration project monitoring committee and is a member of UNISON.

She was diagnosed with bone-marrow cancer in May 2008. In October 2009 she announced that she would step down from her Assembly seat at the next election in 2011.

References

External links
Karen Sinclair AM Website
Welsh Labour Party Website
Website of the Welsh Assembly Government 
Website of the National Assembly for Wales

Offices held

1952 births
Living people
Councillors in Wales
Welsh Labour members of the Senedd
Wales AMs 1999–2003
Wales AMs 2003–2007
Wales AMs 2007–2011
Members of the Welsh Assembly Government
People educated at Grove Park School, Wrexham
School governors
People from Wrexham
People with multiple myeloma
Women councillors in Wales